Clear waters and green mountains, alternatively green mountains are gold mountains or two mountain theory, refers to a political slogan on environmental policy formulated by Chinese Communist Party (CCP) general secretary Xi Jinping. The full slogan is "clear waters and green mountains are as valuable as gold and silver mountains".

History and usage
Xi Jinping first mentioned the slogan in August 2005 while on tour in Zhejiang as its Party Committee Secretary.

Following the 2012 ascension of Xi as the CCP general secretary (paramount leader), the slogan has been invoked in various contexts domestically and internationally by Chinese officials, complementing existing emphasis on the achievement of ecological civilization. It was given greater emphasis in Chinese state media beginning in 2015, after Xi began to focus more on environmental issues. The slogan was the subject of a short essay question in Beijing for the 2018 gaokao, generating discussion over the suitability of such an explicitly political topic on the test.

Theory
The Chinese Communist Party-run Beijing Review maintains that the slogan "reflects a people-centered approach to people's wellbeing, an approach that emphasizes the importance of harmony between man and nature, and embodies the unwavering resolve of the Party and the government to preserve and protect the natural environment."

"Clear waters and green mountains" alludes to what Xi observed as phases of economic development in relation to environmentalism. In the first phase, initial industrialization, little regard is given to the environment, which is sacrificed in pursuit of economic growth. As people become more aware of the importance of the environment, they call for its preservation and protection in second phase. Finally, society realizes that "clear waters and green mountains" and "gold and silver mountains" are not mutually exclusive, and in fact the former can bestow the latter.

See also 

 Ideology of the Chinese Communist Party
 Environmental policy in China

References

Xi Jinping
Ideology of the Chinese Communist Party
Environmentalism in China
Propaganda in China
Slogans
2005 neologisms
Environmental sayings